Restheniini is a tribe of plant bugs in the family Miridae. There are at least 4 genera and 30 described species in Restheniini.

Genera
These four genera belong to the tribe Restheniini:
 Oncerometopus Reuter, 1876 i c g
 Opistheurista Carvalho, 1959 i c g
 Platytylus Fieber, 1858 i c g
 Prepops Reuter, 1905 i c g
Data sources: i = ITIS, c = Catalogue of Life, g = GBIF, b = Bugguide.net

References

Further reading

External links

 

 
Mirinae
Hemiptera tribes